Yimnashana denticulata is a species of beetle in the family Cerambycidae. It was described by Gressitt in 1937. It is known from Laos and China.

References

Gyaritini
Beetles described in 1937